The discography of Japanese punk rock band TsuShiMaMiRe, including officially released demos, single, albums, and compilations. While TsuShiMaMiRe has often adopted English translations for international promotion, the titles printed on the original CD release are used with romanized English.

Discography

Albums

Singles and EPs

Compilations

References

Tsu Shi Ma Mi Re albums